Postalveolar or post-alveolar consonants are consonants articulated with the tongue near or touching the back of the alveolar ridge. Articulation is farther back in the mouth than the alveolar consonants, which are at the ridge itself, but not as far back as the hard palate, the place of articulation for palatal consonants. Examples of postalveolar consonants are the English palato-alveolar consonants , as in the words "ship", "'chill", "vision", and "jump", respectively.

There are many types of postalveolar sounds—especially among the sibilants. The palato-alveolar and alveolo-palatal subtypes are commonly counted as "palatals" in phonology since they rarely contrast with true palatal consonants.

Postalveolar sibilants
For most sounds involving the tongue, the place of articulation can be sufficiently identified just by specifying the point of contact on the upper part of the mouth (for example, velar consonants involve contact on the soft palate and dental consonants involve the teeth), along with any secondary articulation such as palatalization (raising of the tongue body) or labialization (lip rounding).

However, among sibilants, particularly postalveolar sibilants, there are slight differences in the shape of the tongue and the point of contact on the tongue itself, which correspond to large differences in the resulting sound. For example, the alveolar fricative  and the three postalveolar fricatives  differ noticeably both in pitch and sharpness; the order  corresponds to progressively lower-pitched and duller (less "hissy" or piercing) sounds. ( is the highest-pitched and most piercing, which is the reason that hissing sounds like "Sssst!" or "Psssst!" are typically used to attract someone's attention). As a result, it is necessary to specify many additional subtypes.

Tongue shape
The main distinction is the shape of the tongue, which corresponds to differing degrees of palatalization (raising of the body of the tongue). The increasing palatalization corresponds to progressively higher-pitched and sharper-sounding consonants.

Less technically, the retroflex consonant  sounds somewhat like a mixture between the regular English  of "ship" and the "h" at the beginning of "heard", especially when it is pronounced forcefully and with a strong American "r".

Palato-alveolar sounds are normally described as having a convex (a bunched-up or domed) tongue. The front, central part of the tongue is somewhat raised compared to the tip, back and sides, which gives it a weak palatalization. For retroflex sounds, the tongue shape is either concave (usually when apical or subapical, made with the tip of the tongue) or flat (usually when laminal, made with the area behind the tongue tip). For alveolo-palatal sounds, the front half of the tongue is flat and raised so that it closely parallels the upper surface of the mouth, from the teeth to the hard palate. Behind that is a sudden convex bend.

The following table shows the three types of postalveolar sibilant fricatives defined in the IPA:

Point of tongue contact (laminal, apical, subapical)
A second variable is whether the contact occurs with the very tip of the tongue (an apical articulation ), with the surface just above the tip, the blade of the tongue (a laminal articulation ), or with the underside of the tip (a subapical articulation). Apical and subapical articulations are always "tongue-up", with the tip of the tongue above the teeth, and laminal articulations are often "tongue-down", with the tip of the tongue behind the lower teeth.

The upward curvature of the tongue tip to make apical or subapical contact renders palatalization more difficult so domed (palato-alveolar) consonants are not attested with subapical articulation and fully palatalized (such as alveolo-palatal) sounds occur only with laminal articulation. Also, the apical-laminal distinction among palato-alveolar sounds makes little (although presumably non-zero) perceptible difference; both articulations, in fact, occur among English-speakers.

As a result, the differing points of tongue contact (laminal, apical and subapical) are significant largely for retroflex sounds. Retroflex sounds can also occur outside of the postalveolar region, ranging from as far back as the hard palate to as far forward as the alveolar region behind the teeth. Subapical retroflex sounds are often palatal (and vice versa), which occur particularly in the Dravidian languages.

Position of tongue tip (laminal "closed")
There is an additional distinction that can be made among tongue-down laminal sounds, depending on exactly where behind the lower teeth the tongue tip is placed. A bit behind the lower teeth is a hollow area (or pit) in the lower surface of the mouth. When the tongue tip rests in the hollowed area, there is an empty space below the tongue (a sublingual cavity), which results in a relatively more "hushing" sound. When the tip of the tongue rests against the lower teeth, there is no sublingual cavity, resulting in a more "hissing" sound. Generally, the tongue-down postalveolar consonants have the tongue tip on the hollowed area (with a sublingual cavity), whereas for the tongue-down alveolar consonants, the tongue tip rests against the teeth (no sublingual cavity), which accentuates the hissing vs. hushing distinction of these sounds.

However, the palato-alveolar sibilants in Northwest Caucasian languages such as the extinct Ubykh have the tongue tip resting directly against the lower teeth rather than in the hollowed area. Ladefoged and Maddieson term it a "closed laminal postalveolar" articulation, which gives the sounds a quality that Catford describes as "hissing-hushing" sounds.

A laminal "closed" articulation could also be made with alveolo-palatal sibilants and a laminal "non-closed" articulation with alveolar sibilants, but no language appears to do so. In addition, no language seems to have a minimal contrast between two sounds based only on the "closed"/"non-closed" variation, with no concomitant articulatory distinctions (for all languages, including the Northwest Caucasian languages, if the language has two laminal sibilants, one of which is "closed" and the other is "non-closed", they will also differ in some other ways).

Examples
A few languages distinguish three different postalveolar sibilant tongue shapes such as the Sino-Tibetan Northern Qiang and Southern Qiang, which make such a distinction among affricates (but only a two-way distinction among fricatives) and the Northwest Caucasian languages Ubykh (now extinct) and Abkhaz. More common are languages such as Mandarin Chinese and Polish, which distinguish two postalveolar sibilants, typically  since they are maximally distinct.

The attested possibilities, with exemplar languages, are as follows. IPA diacritics are simplified, and some articulations would require two diacritics to be fully specified, but only one is used to keep the results legible without the need for OpenType IPA fonts. Also, Peter Ladefoged, whose notation is used here, has resurrected an obsolete IPA symbol, the under dot, to indicate the apical postalveolar, which is normally included in the category of retroflex consonants. The notation  is sometimes reversed, and either may also be called 'retroflex' and written .

Postalveolar non-sibilants
Non-sibilant sounds can also be made in the postalveolar region, the number of acoustically distinct variations is then significantly reduced. The primary distinction for such sounds is between laminal palatalized and apical retroflex non-palatalized. (Subapical retroflex non-sibilants also occur but tend to be palatal, as for sibilants.)

Non-palatalized (retroflex)
Retroflex stops, nasals and laterals (like ) occur in a number of languages across the world such as in South Asian languages such as Hindi and various East Asian languages such as Vietnamese. Also, for some languages that distinguish "dental" vs. "alveolar" stops and nasals, they are actually articulated nearer to prealveolar and postalveolar, respectively.

The normal rhotic consonant (r-sound) in American English is a retroflex approximant  (the equivalent in British English is an alveolar approximant ). Retroflex rhotics of various sorts, especially approximants and flaps occur commonly in the world's languages. Some languages also have retroflex trills. Toda is particularly unusual in that it has six trills, including a palatalized/non-palatalized distinction and a three-way place distinction among dental, alveolar and retroflex trills.

Palatalized
Palatalized postalveolar non-sibilants are usually considered to be alveolo-palatal. Some non-sibilant sounds in some languages are said to be palato-alveolar rather than alveolo-palatal, but in practice, it is unclear if there is any consistent acoustic distinction between the two types of sounds.

Even the two types are often not distinguished among nasals and laterals, as almost all languages have only one palatalized/palatal nasal or lateral in their phonemic inventories.

The IPA does not have specific symbols for alveolo-palatal non-sibilants, but they can be denoted using the advanced diacritic like . Sinologists often use special symbols for alveolo-palatal non-sibilants, created by analogy with the curls used to mark alveolo-palatal sibilants. However, the actual sounds indicated using these symbols are often palatal or palatalized alveolar rather than alveolo-palatal, like the variation for symbols like . The decision to use the special alveolo-palatal symbols in sinology is largely based on distributional similarities between the sounds in question and the alveolo-palatal sibilants, which are prominent in many East Asian languages.

However, a few languages distinguish alveolo-palatal sounds from other palatalized non-sibilants in the dental-to-palatal region. Many conservative dialects of Irish in fact have a three-way distinction among palatalized nasals between dorsal palatal , laminal alveolo-palatal , and apical palatalized alveolar . That is typical with oppositions among similar sounds in a single language, the sounds being maximally different in that each one differs both in the point of contact on the tongue (dorsal vs. laminal vs. apical) and the roof of the mouth (palatal vs. postalveolar vs. alveolar from all others). The other dialects have lost one of the two palatalized coronals but still have a two-way distinction. A similar distinction between palatal  and alveolo-palatal  exists in some nonstandard forms of Malayalam.

Examples

Some languages distinguish palatalized (alveolo-palatal) and non-palatalized (retroflex) postalveolar nasals and/or laterals.

Some Australian languages distinguish four coronal nasals and laterals: laminal dental , apical alveolar , laminal postalveolar (palatalized) , and apical postalveolar (retroflex) .

The nonstandard Malayalam dialects mentioned above have five acute (including four coronal) nasals: laminal dental , apical alveolar , laminal postalveolar (palatalized) , subapical palatal (retroflex) , and dorsal palatal (palatalized)  (in addition to labial  and velar ). Standard Malayalam lacks the laminal palatalized postalveolar.

The conservative Irish dialects mentioned above also have five acute nasals, again including four coronal; however, only four different primary articulations are involved, as a secondary velarized/palatalized distinction is at play. The sounds in question are laminal dental velarized , apical alveolar velarized , apical alveolar palatalized , laminal postalveolar (palatalized) , and dorsal palatal  (in addition to labial velarized , labial palatalized  and velar ). The eight sounds participate in four velarized/palatalized pairs: ; ; ; . Other dialects have variously reduced the four coronal nasals to three or two.

Postalveolar clicks
There are two postalveolar click types that can occur, commonly described as "postalveolar" and "palatal", but they would be perhaps more accurately described as apical and laminal postalveolar, respectively:

See also

 Place of articulation
 Palato-alveolar consonant
 Alveolo-palatal consonant
 Retroflex consonant
 List of phonetics topics

References

Place of articulation